Xie Weichao (Chinese: 谢维超; born 6 July 1989 in Liaoning) is a Chinese football player who currently plays for China League One side Shenyang Urban.

Club career
In 2008, Xie Weichao started his professional footballer career with Changsha Ginde in the Chinese Super League. He would eventually make his league debut for Changsha on 12 April 2008 in a game against Hangzhou Greentown. In February 2011, Xie transferred to China League One side Hunan Billows.

In March 2016, Xie transferred to fellow  League One side Baoding Yingli Yitong. In March 2019, Xie transferred to China League Two side Shenyang Urban. He would go on to win the 2019 China League Two division with the club.

Career statistics 
Statistics accurate as of match played 31 December 2020.

Honours

Club
Shenyang Urban
 China League Two: 2019

References

External links

1989 births
Living people
Chinese footballers
Footballers from Liaoning
Changsha Ginde players
Hunan Billows players
Baoding Yingli Yitong players
Liaoning Shenyang Urban F.C. players
Chinese Super League players
China League One players
China League Two players
Association football midfielders